Gordana is a Slavic female first name, mostly used in Slavic countries such as Croatia, Serbia, Montenegro, North Macedonia, Slovenia, Bosnia and Herzegovina. Name is derived from Proto-Slavic *gъrdъ (gȏrd) meaning proud.

Notable people 

 Gordana Baric, international lawn bowls competitor for Australia
 Gordana Boban (born 1967), Bosnian actress
 Gordana Bogojević (born 1974 - died 2009), Serbian basketball player
 Gordana Božinovska (born 1965), Serbian singer
 Gordana Čomić (born 1958), Serbian politician
 Gordana Đilas (born 1958), Serbian poet
 Gordana Gadžić (born 1955), Serbian actress
 Gordana Grubin (born 1972), Serbian basketball player
 Gordana Jankuloska (born 1975), Macedonian politician
 Gordana Jurčan (born 1971), Croatian volleyball player
 Gordana Kamenarović (born 1958), Serbian actress
 Gordana Knezević (born 1950), Serbian journalist
 Gordana Komadina (born 1976), Croatian basketball player
 Gordana Kuić (born 1942), Serbian novelist
 Gordana Matic, Croatian-American mathematician
 Gordana Matković (born 1960), Serbian politician
 Gordana Perkučin (born 1962), Serbian table tennis player
 Gordana Suša (1946–2021), Serbian journalist
 Gordana Marinković (born 1974), Serbian singer
 Gordana Turuk (born 1974), Slovak artist with Croatian heritage
 Gordana Vunjak-Novakovic, Serbian American biomedical engineer

Feminine given names
Serbian feminine given names
Croatian feminine given names
Macedonian feminine given names
Montenegrin feminine given names
Bosnian feminine given names
Slovene feminine given names
Slavic feminine given names